Galeso Nichesola (died 1527) was a Roman Catholic prelate who served as Bishop of Belluno (1509–1527).

Biography
On 19 Sep 1509, Galeso Nichesola was appointed during the papacy of Pope Julius II as Bishop of Belluno.
He served as Bishop of Belluno until his death on 2 Aug 1527.

References

External links and additional sources
 (for Chronology of Bishops) 
 (for Chronology of Bishops)  

16th-century Italian Roman Catholic bishops
Bishops appointed by Pope Julius II
1527 deaths